The 1985 Drake Bulldogs football team represented the Drake University as a member of the Missouri Valley Conference (MVC) during the 1985 NCAA Division I-AA football season. Led by ninth-year head coach Chuck Shelton, Drake compiled an overall record of 4–7 with a mark of 1–5 in conference play. By mid-October the team was 4–3, a record that included wins over in-state opponents Northern Iowa and Iowa State, but ended the season on a four-game skid. After the season, Drake announced it would drop its football program for the 1986 season and transition to NCAA Division III for the 1987 season.

Schedule

References

Drake
Drake Bulldogs football seasons
Drake Bulldogs football